Colorcocha or Collorcocha (possibly from Quechua quyllur star, qucha lake, "star lake") is a lake in the Lima Region in Peru. It is located in the Cajatambo Province, Cajatambo District. Quyllurqucha lies in the Pumarinri valley south of the Huayhuash mountain range, between  Pucaccacca in the north and Millpo in the south. The lakes named Huarmicocha (possibly in Quechua Warmiqucha, "woman lake") and Challhuacocha (possibly in Quechua Challwaqucha, "fish lake") lie west.

See also
List of lakes in Peru

References

Lakes of Peru
Lakes of Lima Region